Adrian Olegov (born 1 May 1985 in Pernik) is a Bulgarian former football defender.

References

External links
 

1985 births
Living people
Bulgarian footballers
Association football defenders
First Professional Football League (Bulgaria) players
Sportspeople from Pernik
PFC CSKA Sofia players
PFC Minyor Pernik players
FC Chavdar Etropole players
Neftochimic Burgas players
Ħamrun Spartans F.C. players
Expatriate footballers in Malta
Bulgarian expatriates in Malta